Bhola Raut (born 4 November 1914, date of death unknown) was an Indian politician who was a member of the Indian National Congress.

Personal life 
Bhola Raut was born on 4 November 1914 into the Mehtar caste to Harihar Raut at Bettiah, Champaran, Bihar and Orissa Province (now West Champaran, Bihar).

Politics 
He was elected to the lower house of the Indian Parliament, the Lok Sabha, from Bagaha constituency, Bihar, in 1952, 1957, 1962, 1967, 1971, 1980 and 1984. He was also a member of the Provisional Parliament in 1950–51.

He was a former Secretary of Depressed Classes League, General Secretary of Mehtar Dom Sabha, the Vice President of All India Mehtar Mazdoor Sangh, President of Bihar State Safai Mazdoor Sangh and General Secretary of Bihar State Scavengers Association.

References

External links
Official biographical sketch in Parliament of India website

1914 births
Year of death missing
India MPs 1952–1957
India MPs 1957–1962
India MPs 1962–1967
India MPs 1967–1970
India MPs 1971–1977
India MPs 1980–1984
India MPs 1984–1989
Indian National Congress politicians
Lok Sabha members from Bihar
Indian National Congress politicians from Bihar